Jubilee Mission Medical College and Research Institute is a private, non-profit Christian minority medical college, hospital and research institute located at Thrissur in Kerala, India. The establishment is administered by the Jubilee Mission Hospital Trust, a charitable organisation under the Catholic Archdiocese of Thrissur.

History
Jubilee Mission Hospital was established on 17 December 1951 as a small dispensary. In 1952, the hospital began its service with 4 rooms, 20 beds, 2 retired part-time doctors and 2 nurses of the Holy Cross Congregation. Under the leadership of Dr H.S. Adenwalla, the mission hospital grew to 1750 beds and is a major provider of health care services in Kerala.

Nursing school commenced in 1966 and the hospital was recognised by the Medical Council of India (MCI) in 1971 for internship training of doctors. Training of post graduate medical students for the National Board of Examinations commenced in 1990. In 2003, the MCI recognised the Jubilee Mission Hospital as a teaching hospital. The institution subsequently opened the Jubilee Medical College and the Jubilee School of Nursing

Overview

Facilities
Staff strength: 3,850
Total beds: 1750 
Total ICU beds: 300
Total operation theatres: 22 
Total outpatients: 1,350,000 
Total floor space: 1,295,000 ft² (120,250 m2)

PHCs and Outreach Centres
The institute runs 5 PHCs and satellite hospitals in and around Thrissur 

St. Antony's Mission Hospital, Pazhuvil
Mary Immaculate Mission Hospital, Engandiyur
Padua Mission Hospital, Puthenpeedika
Rural Health Centre: Mulayam
Urban Health Centre: Nadathara

Achievements
Jubilee Medical College has been consistently ranked the top medical school in the state under Kerala University of Health Sciences with regards to MBBS exam performance 

The hospital started one of the first human milk banks in the state, alongside General Hospital Ernakulam.

The institute started the first interventional neurology cathlab in the district of Thrissur.

Departments
The hospital includes the following departments:

Administrative Departments
 Biomedical Engineering
 Central Library
 Medical Records
 Medical Education Unit

Clinical Departments
 Anaesthesiology
 Anatomy
 Biochemistry
 Biostatistics
 Cardiology
 Cardiothoracic Surgery
 Clinical Psychology
 Critical Care
 Dentistry
 Dermatology
 Dietetics
 Emergency Medicine
 Endocrinology
 Forensic Medicine & Toxicology
 Gastroenterology
 General Surgery
 Head & Neck Surgery
 Immunohaematology
 Interventional Cardiology
 Internal Medicine
 Laboratory Medicine
 Microbiology
 Microvascular Surgery
 Neonatology
 Nephrology
 Neurology
 Neurosurgery
 Obstetrics & Gynaecology
 Oncology
 Oncosurgery
 Ophthalmology
 Otorhinolaryngology (ENT)
 Oral & Maxillofacial Surgery
 Pathology
 Paediatrics
 Paediatric Surgery
 Pharmacology
 Physical Medicine & Rehabilitation
 Physiology
 Physiotherapy
 Plastic Surgery
 Preventive & Social Medicine
 Psychiatry
 Pulmonology
 Radiology
 Rheumatology
 Sleep Medicine
 Speech Therapy
 Speech Pathology
 Sports Medicine
 Surgical Oncology
 Urology
 Transfusion Medicine
 Trauma & Orthopaedic Surgery
 Vascular Surgery

Specialised Units & Facilities
 Blood Bank
 Burns Unit
 Dialysis Unit
 Geriatric Home Care Service
 Human Milk Bank
 Hyperbaric Oxygen Therapy Unit
 Interventional Neurology Cathlab
 RNTCP Unit & DOTS Centre
 Snakebite Unit
 Small Animal Research Laboratory

Specialist Centres

Jubilee Hrudhayalaya
Jubilee Hrudhayalaya is a fully integrated Cardiovascular centre providing multidimensional care. It is the largest exclusive cardiac centre in the state of Kerala, having 300 dedicated cardiac beds and 80 critical care beds.

Charles Pinto Centre for Cleft Lip and Palate
The Charles Pinto Centre provides comprehensive care for patients with congenital clefts of the lip, palate and complex facial clefts. This department is an internationally accepted center of excellence, which is very often visited by plastic surgeons from around the world. The credit of origin & existence goes to Dr. H.S. Adenwalla who has successfully corrected about 16,000 such patients at the institute, a world record.

The procedures are provided free of cost which attracts people not only from Kerala, but from the rest of India.

The centre has partnered with Smile Train, a charitable organisation based in New York, USA, that helps with funding for treatment of cleft patients. The Charles Pinto Centre was the first to be inspected and accepted as a partner in India by Smile Train.

Jubilee Institute of Surgery for Hand Aesthetic & Microsurgery (JISHAM)
A specialist institute led by the Department of Plastic Surgery, dealing with the surgery of hand and upper extremity, reconstructive microsurgery, cosmetic surgery, reconstruction of congenital & acquired defects of the trunk.

Jubilee Hyperbaric Oxygen Therapy Centre (Jubilee HBOT)
The Hyperbaric Oxygen Therapy Center is jointly managed by Jubilee Institute of Surgery for Hand Aesthetic & Microsurgery (JISHAM) and the Jubilee Burns Center.

Jubilee Institute for Tissue Engineering Research (JITER)
Using regenerative medicine and tissue engineered skin substitutes to develop artificial skin that can replicate normal skin. Unit has funding grants from the ER & IPR directorate at DRDO. The project is also under collaboration with College of Veterinary and Animal Sciences, Thrissur (part of the Kerala Veterinary and Animal Sciences University).

Jubilee Centre for Medical Research (JCMR)
Jubilee Centre for Medical Research (JCMR) is a DSIR recognised research centre established by the Jubilee Mission Hospital Trust. The research activities in the Jubilee institutions are now coordinated by JCMR. This research centre undertakes and promotes research projects funded by governmental agencies, NGOs and those leading to the award of degrees like MD / MS / DNB / DM / Ph.D.

Dr. D. M. Vasudevan, a well known scientist, Dr. B C Roy Award recipient, Biochemistry Professor and renowned author took charge as Research Director of JCMR in April 2014.

Thrust areas of research at the centre includes:
 Molecular biology and cytogenetics
 Biochemistry, microbiology and virology
 Epidemiology, public health and occupational health
 Clinical Medicine and Nursing
 Histology, cytology and immunohistochemistry
 Pharmacology and ethnomedicine

Academics

Academic divisions

 Jubilee Mission Medical College Hospital (JMMCH)
 Jubilee Mission Medical College (JMMC)
 Jubilee Mission College of Nursing (JMCON)
 Jubilee Mission School of Nursing (JMSON)
 Jubilee Mission College of Allied Health Sciences (JMCAHS)
 Jubilee Centre for Medical Research (JCMR)
 Jubilee Ayurveda Mission Hospital

Courses Offered
The medical college annually accepts 100 students for the MBBS undergraduate course based on performance in the national medical entrance exam NEET. The MBBS course consists of four and a half years of academic training, followed by one year of internship as a House Surgeon.

It accepts postgraduate trainees (MD/MS) in a number of specialties.
Currently, 47 postgraduate training seats are offered in the specialties of:
	Anaesthesiology (MD)
	Community Medicine (MD)
   Dermatology, Venereology & Leprosy (MD)
	Emergency Medicine	(MD)
   General Medicine (MD)
	General Surgery	(MS)
	Microbiology (MD)
	Obstetrics and Gynaecology (MS)
	Ophthalmology (MS)
   Otorhinolaryngology (MS)
	Paediatrics	(MD)
	Pathology (MD)
	Physiology (MD)
	Psychiatry (MD)
	Radiology & Radiodiagnosis (MD)
   Respiratory Medicine (MD)
	Transfusion Medicine (MD)
	Trauma & Orthopaedic Surgery (MS)	

The college also accepts trainees for higher super-specialist training.
Courses run currently are:
 Neurosurgery (DNB)
 Cardiology (DM)
 Neurology (DM)

Other PG Medical Courses:
 Critical Care Medicine (IDCCM)
 Fellowship in Cardiothoracic Anaesthesia
 Fellowship in Neonatology
 Fellowship In Orthognathic Surgery 
 Fellowship in Ultrasound Guided Regional Anaesthesia

The institute runs the IDCCM (Indian Diploma in Critical Care Medicine) programme, making it one of only two medical colleges in the state providing super specialty training in Critical Care Medicine.

Various other courses are run, including nursing and allied health professions.
Courses offered include:

Nursing
 GNM Nursing & Midwifery
 BSc Nursing
 MSc Medical Surgical Nursing
 MSc Pediatric Nursing
 MSc Community Health Nursing
 MSc Fundamental & Mental Health Nursing
 Post-Basic Diploma Cardiothoracic Nursing
 PG Diploma in various nursing clinical specialties

Allied Health Professions
 Diploma in Anaesthesia Technology.
 Diploma in Medical Records Technology
 Diploma In Medical Imaging Technology
 Diploma in Medical Laboratory Technology
 Diploma In Optometry

Student life
 Ashraya Charitable Society
 Jubilee Campus Radio
 Jubilee Quest - Student run society to promote research among students
 Campus Ground & Sports Courts
 Students' Gym
 Various eateries within campus
 Campus supermarket, cafes, libraries and ATMs

Other Activities

JUBICON

JUBICON national medical students’ conclave organised and conducted by the various student clubs and Jubilee Centre for Medical Research. It intends to facilitate students oriented towards research and develop them into scientific thinkers that transform ideas into discovery. Integrating the various facets of life is an important aspect of JUBICON. Research requires a multivariate and guided approach, and JUBICON brings together experts in the fields of research and advanced technologies.

JUBICON Webpage

Educational Workshops & Courses

Department of Emergency Medicine
AUTLS- AIIMS Ultrasound Trauma Life Support 
BASIC - Basic Assessment & Support in Intensive Care
BLS - Basic Life Support Course
ACLS - Advanced Cardiac Life Support Course
BECC - Basic Emergency Care Course
First Responder Course

Department of Immunohaematology
CASCADE Workshop - A coagulation workshop conducted annually

Department of Obstetrics & Gynaecology
 FOCUS Training Programme

Public Health Programmes

Department of Community Medicine
Immunisation Camps
Health Education Camps
School Health Programmes
Various Public Health Awareness Camps
Blood Donation Camps

Department of Immunohaematology
Blood Donation Camps

Department of Ophthalmology
Eye Checkup Camps
Eye Donation Camps
Public Eye Health Awareness Camps

See also
List of medical colleges in India
List of largest hospital campuses
Dr HS Adenwalla
Dr DM Vasudevan

References

External links

 Official Website

Research institutes in Kerala
Medical colleges in Thrissur
Colleges affiliated with the Kerala University of Health Sciences
Catholic universities and colleges in India
1951 establishments in India
Hospitals in Thrissur
Private medical colleges in India
Educational institutions established in 1951
Teaching hospitals in India